The Anton blood group antigen is a cell surface receptor found on some human red blood cells. It has been observed to play a role in Haemophilus influenzae infections. Studies showed that bacterium can adhere to this receptor and cause human red blood cells to agglutinate.

References

Transmembrane receptors
Blood cells
Microbiology